Michael Corcoran (September 21, 1827 – December 22, 1863) was an Irish-American general in the Union Army during the American Civil War and a close confidant of President Abraham Lincoln. As its colonel, he led the 69th New York Regiment to Washington, D.C., and was one of the first to serve in the defense of Washington by building Fort Corcoran. He then led the 69th into action at the First Battle of Bull Run.  After promotion to brigadier general, he left the 69th and formed the Corcoran Legion, consisting of at least five other New York regiments.

Early life

Corcoran was born in Carrowkeel, near Ballymote, County Sligo in Ireland, the only child of Thomas Corcoran, an officer in the British Army, and Mary (McDonagh) Corcoran. Through his mother, he claimed descent from Patrick Sarsfield, hero of the Williamite War in Ireland and a leader of the Wild Geese.

In 1846, at the age of 18, he took an appointment to the Revenue Police, enforcing the laws and searching for illicit stills and distilling activities in Creeslough, County Donegal. At the same time he joined and belonged to a Catholic rebel guerrilla group, the Ribbonmen. On August 30, 1849, he emigrated from Sligo Bay to the U.S. and settled in New York City where he found work as a clerk in the tavern, Hibernian House, at 42 Prince Street in Manhattan owned by John Heaney, whose niece, Elizabeth, he married in 1854.

He enlisted as a Private in the 69th New York Militia. By 1859 he was appointed colonel of the regiment.  The regiment was a state militia unit at that time composed of citizens, not soldiers, and was involved in the maintenance of public order.  On October 11, 1860, Colonel Corcoran refused to march the regiment on parade for the 19-year-old Prince of Wales, who was visiting New York City at the time, to protest against British rule in Ireland. He was removed from command and a court martial was pending over that matter when the Civil War began.

Corcoran became involved in Democratic politics at Tammany Hall: he could deliver the Irish vote. He became  district leader, a member of the judicial nominations committee, an elected school inspector for his ward, and a member of the Fourteenth Ward General Committee.

Civil War

With the outbreak of war, the court martial was dropped and Corcoran was restored to his command because he had been instrumental in bringing other Irish immigrants to the Union cause.  He led the 69th to Washington, D.C., and served for a while in the Washington defenses building Fort Corcoran.  In July he led the regiment into action at the First Battle of Bull Run and was taken prisoner.

Corcoran was one of the founders of the Fenian Brotherhood in America. While in jail, Corcoran wrote, "One half of my heart is Erin's, and the other half is America's.  God bless America, and ever preserve her the asylum of all the oppressed of the earth, is the sincere prayer of my heart."

In April 1863 Corcoran was involved in an incident that ended with Corcoran shooting and killing Edgar A. Kimball, commander of the  9th New York Volunteer Infantry Regiment. Corcoran attempted to pass through the 9th New York's area without giving the required password after receiving the challenge from a sentry. When Kimball intervened on the side of the sentry, Corcoran shot Kimball. At a court of inquiry, Kimball was faulted for interacting with Corcoran though Kimball was not on duty and was not a sentry, and for using menacing and insulting language. In addition, some witnesses suggested that Kimball was intoxicated when he confronted Corcoran. Corcoran was found at fault for not providing the required password; he was reprimanded by the court, but not subjected to further punishment.

Corcoran Legion and death

Corcoran returned to the army and set about recruiting more Irish volunteers.  He raised and took command of what would be known as the Corcoran Legion:
The Legion consisted of:
1st Regiment-formed of the 1st and 6th Regiment; later the 182nd New York Volunteer Infantry
2nd Regiment-formed of the 5th and 6th Regiment; later the 155th New York Volunteer Infantry
3rd Regiment-formed of the 3rd; 7th and 8th Regiment; later the 164th New York Volunteer Infantry
4th Regiment-formed of the 2nd Regiment; later the 170th New York Volunteer Infantry
5th Regiment-never served with Brigade; later the 175th New York Volunteer Infantry
6th Regiment-below minimum strength-later part of 1st and 2nd Regiment
7th Regiment-below minimum strength-later part of the 3rd Regiment
8th Regiment-below minimum strength-later part of the 3rd Regiment

Placed in command of the 1st Division, VII Corps he was engaged in the Battle of Deserted House and took part in the siege of Suffolk.  In late 1863 he was placed in command of a division in the XXII Corps and returned to serve in the Washington defenses. While riding alone in Fairfax, Virginia he was thrown from a runaway horse and suffered a fractured skull. He died at the W.P. Gunnell House on December 22, 1863 at the age of 36.

Ballymote Memorial

The Mayor of New York City, Michael Bloomberg unveiled Ireland's national monument to the Fighting 69th in Ballymote on August 22, 2006. The monument was sculpted by Philip Flanagan.  The inscription around the top of the monument reads "Michael Corcoran 1827–1863"  Around the base is inscribed "New York Ballymote Creeslough Bull Run". Underneath the monument is a piece of steel from the World Trade Center, donated by the family of Michael Lynch, who died in the tower on September 11, 2001.  Lynch's family are from County Sligo.

Further reading
 Samito, Christian G., Becoming American under Fire: Irish Americans, African Americans and the Politics of Citizenship during the Civil war Era, Ithaca: Cornell University Press, 2009; 
 Corcoran, Michael, The Captivity of General Corcoran. Published by Barclay & Co., 602 Arch Street, 1864.

See also

List of American Civil War generals (Union)
Irish military diaspora
Irish Brigade
Irish regiment
Irish-American Heritage Month

References

External links

General Michael Corcoran, USA at history central.com

1827 births
1863 deaths
Members of the Irish Republican Brotherhood
American Civil War prisoners of war
Burials at Calvary Cemetery (Queens)
Irish Brigade (U.S.)
Irish emigrants to the United States (before 1923)
People from County Sligo
People of New York (state) in the American Civil War
Union Army generals
Irish soldiers in the United States Army
New York (state) Democrats
O'Moore family
Deaths by horse-riding accident in the United States